The 1969 Florida A&M Rattlers football team was an American football team that represented Florida A&M University as a member of the Southern Intercollegiate Athletic Conference (SIAC) during the 1969 NCAA College  Division football season. In their 25th and final season under head coach Jake Gaither, the Rattlers compiled an 8–1 record, were ranked No. 16 in the final 1969 AP small college poll, and defeated  in the Orange Blossom Classic.

Schedule

References

Florida AandM
Florida A&M Rattlers football seasons
Florida AandM Rattlers football